The Battle of Kunovica or Battle at Kunovitsa was the battle between crusaders led by John Hunyadi and armies of the Ottoman Empire which took place on 2 or 5 January 1444 near mountain Kunovica (Suva Planina) between Pirot and Niš.

Battle 
The Christian contingent began their retreat on 24 December 1443, after the Battle of Zlatica. The Ottoman forces followed them across the rivers Iskar and Nišava and in the Kunorica pass attacked (some sources say ambushed by) the rear flanks of the retreating armies composed of armies of the Serbian Despotate under command of Đurađ Branković. The battle took place during the night, under the full moon. Hunyadi and Władysław who were already through the pass left their supplies guarded by infantry and attacked Ottoman forces near the river on the eastern side of the mountain. The Ottomans were defeated and many Ottoman commanders, including Mahmud Çelebi of Çandarlı family (in some earlier sources referred to as Karambeg), were captured. 

The Ottoman defeat in the Battle of Kunovica and capture of Mahmud Bey, the Sultan's son-in-law, created the impression of an overall victorious campaign. According to some sources, Skanderbeg participated in this battle on the Ottoman side and deserted Ottoman forces during the conflict.

Aftermath 

Four days after this battle the Christian coalition reached Prokuplje. Đurađ Branković proposed to Władysław III of Poland and John Hunyadi to stay in Serbian fortified towns during the winter and continue their campaign against the Ottomans in the spring of 1444. They rejected his proposal and retreated. By the end of January 1444 forces of Władysław and Hunyadi reached Belgrade and in February they arrived in Buda where they were greeted as heroes. During 1444 ambassadors of Christian forces were sent to Adrianople and organized signing of a ten-years long peace treaty known as the Peace of Szeged.

Contemporary Ottoman sources blame rivalry between the commanders Kasim and Turahan for the defeat at Kunovica, while some claim that the Serbian Despot Đurađ Branković bribed Turahan not to participate in the battle. Turahan fell from favour as a result and was banished by the Sultan to a prison in Tokat.

This battle is commemorated in Serbian epic song Blow, Wind.

References

Sources 
 
 
 
 
 
 
 
 
 
 
 
 
 

Battles involving Serbia in the Middle Ages
Battles involving Hungary
Battles involving the Ottoman Empire
1444 in the Ottoman Empire
Conflicts in 1444
1444 in Europe
Serbian Despotate
15th century in Serbia